= BCK2 =

Identifiers
- Organism: Saccharomyces cerevisiae S288C
- Symbol: BCK2
- Alt. symbols: CTR7
- Entrez: 856914
- RefSeq (mRNA): NM_001179057.3
- RefSeq (Prot): NP_011094.3
- UniProt: P33306

Other data
- Chromosome: V: 0.52 - 0.52 Mb
Search for
- Structures: Swiss-model
- Domains: InterPro

BCK2, also named CTR7, is an early cell cycle regulator expressed by the yeast Saccharomyces cerevisiae. It was first discovered in a screen for genes whose overexpression would suppress the phenotypes of PKC1 pathway mutations (thus named Bypass of C Kinase). Though its mechanism is currently unknown, it is believed to interact with Swi4 and Mcm1, both important transcriptional regulators of early cell cycle.

== Discovery ==
BCK2 was first discovered in a yeast genomic library screen. An mpk1 deletion strain was transformed with a library of plasmid vectors containing parts of the entire yeast genome. One of the cells that grew out harbored BCK2 on its plasmid, whose overexpression rescued the mpk1 deletion phenotype. In the same publication, Bck2 was found to rescue a pck1 deletion phenotype as well.

== Protein structure ==
BCK2 encodes a 93.7 kDa protein that is 851 amino acids long. The protein is serine/threonine-rich. The expression of BCK2 with a deletion of 189 amino acids of the C-terminus resulted in the loss of CLN3 and BCK2 deletion phenotype. A crystal structure of Bck2 has not been determined.

== Genetics ==
BCK2 loss results in larger cell size resulting from delay of START, a checkpoint in the yeast cell cycle. A double deletion of BCK2 and G1 cyclin CLN3 results in inviability or extremely slow growth. This was found to be a result of G1 arrest Overexpression of CLN2 or RME1 (a transcriptional activator of CLN2) was found to rescue loss of BCK2 and CLN3. Loss of BCK2 also led to a decrease in rate and levels of CLN2 mRNA accumulation in G1, as well as a delay in SWI4 mRNA accumulation.

Overexpression of BCK2 resulted in smaller cell size. Besides rescuing PCK1 pathway mutation phenotypes^{1}, overexpression of BCK2 also rescued the slow growth rate phenotype of a CLN2- and CLN3-null strain.

== Physical interactions ==
A yeast two-hybrid screen revealed that Bck2 physically interacts with Mcm1, Swi4, Yap6, and Mot3. A V69E mutation on a hydrophobic pocket in Mcm1 prevents binding of Yox1 and Fkh2. This same mutation resulted in loss of interaction with Bck2.

== Cell cycle regulation ==
The overexpression and null genetic experiments performed with BCK2 suggests its role as a G1 cell cycle regulator. For example, BCK2-null is synthetically lethal with G1 cyclin CLN3, and leads to a decrease in mRNA levels of another G1 cyclin CLN2 and transcriptional regulator of late-G1 genes SWI4.

A global screen for genes regulated by Bck2 investigated through RNA microarray experiments revealed that Bck2 regulated a wide range of cell cycle genes beyond those associated with G1 phase. The SBF and MBF complexes, which includes protein Swi6, regulate late G1 and G1/S transition genes. Overexpression of Bck2 in Swi6-null cells resulted in changes in expression of genes known to be regulators of the cell cycle, or cell cycle dependent.

40% of the genes found to be regulated by Bck2 were also targets of regulation by Mcm1. Mcm1 activates M/G1 genes through binding to promoters containing Early Cell Cycle Box (ECB) elements. Another study showed gene regulation by Bck2 may be ECB-dependent. BCK2 overexpression leads to CLN3 and SWI4 upregulation. Mutations of ECB elements in CLN3 and SWI4 promoters blocked these effects.

Bck2 may also be sensing cell size to promote crossing of START. Budding yeast senses cell size at START in part through sensing Whi5 concentrations in G1. Cells express the same amount of Whi5 protein independent of size, leading to larger cells having lower concentrations of Whi5. Thus, larger cells take a shorter amount of time from birth to START. Expressing multiple copies of WHI5 led to a linear increase in this time. Importantly, this effect was observed to be greater in BCK2 deletion backgrounds, suggesting that BCK2 may also be sensing cell size to input signals for passing START.
